DCCI may refer to:

 701 (number), written as a Roman numeral
 DCCI Tower, a building in Dhaka, Bangladesh
 Defense Cyber Crime Institute, a division of the United States Department of Defense
 Dhaka Chamber of Commerce & Industry, an organization for businessmen in Bangladesh
 Directional Cubic Convolution Interpolation, an image scaling algorithm
 N,N′-Dicyclohexylcarbodiimide, a chemical compound